Ahmad Muzani (born in Tegal, 15 July 1968) is an entrepreneur and politician from the Great Indonesia Movement Party. He is the Secretary General of the Great Indonesia Movement Party and a member of the House of Representatives (Indonesia).

History 
Since he was a teenager he has been in various organizations in his hometown. He has also been noted to lead the Indonesian Islamic Students (PII), before continuing his education majoring in Communication studies at the Universitas Ibnu Chaldun, Jakarta.

He had plunged into the world of practical politics at the incitement of the Star Reform Party (PBR) formed by Zainuddin M.Z, and had served as Deputy Secretary General. But ahead of the 2009 elections, Muzani who once worked as a manager of an oil palm plantation owned by Prabowo Subianto was thrusting towards Great Indonesia Movement Party.

He then nominated himself as a member of the legislative electoral district of Lampung I which includes Bandar Lampung, West Lampung, South Lampung, Tanggamus, Pesawaran, and Metro. After elections he was announced as the winner representing Senayan from 2009 to 2014 after reaching 24,723 votes. Muzani was sworn into the Commission I in charge of Defense, Foreign Affairs, and Information.

In 2014, he was re-elected as a member of the House of Representatives and was appointed chairman of the faction of Great Indonesia Movement Party in the House of Representatives.

References 

Living people
1968 births
People from Tegal
Great Indonesia Movement Party politicians
Members of the People's Representative Council, 2009
Members of the People's Representative Council, 2014
Members of the People's Representative Council, 2019